Keith Vining was an American writer.  His works included
 Too Hot for Hell (Ace Double D-01, 1952); bound dos-à-dos with Samuel W. Taylor's The Grinning Gismo.
 Keep Running (Chicago Paperback House, 1962).

Too Hot for Hell, along with The Grinning Gismo, is notable in being the first book published by Ace Books, and the first in their well-known Ace Double series.

Year of birth missing
American male novelists